The Kenya National Farmers' Union (KNFU) was created in 1947 to represent farmers to the government of Kenya. Its role is to lobby in support of farmers and protect farmers' interests. Members must pay a subscription fee. Robert Bates, in his 1981 book Markets and States in Tropical Africa, uses the KNFU as an example of how large-scale farmers in 1976, who were disproportionately represented in the KNFU, had considerable clout in increasing prices paid by government marketing boards.

References

Trade unions in Kenya
Agricultural organisations based in Kenya